= Antimima (moth) =

Scientific classification
- Kingdom: Animalia
- Phylum: Arthropoda
- Class: Insecta
- Order: Lepidoptera
- Family: Notodontidae
- Genus: Antimima Turner, 1917

Genus of moths

Antimima is a genus of moths in the family Notodontidae. It was first described by Alfred Jefferis Turner in 1917. Its type species is Antimima cryptica. Species from the genus are found in Australia.

== Species ==
There are two species in the genus:

- A. cryptica Turner, 1917
- A. corystes Turner, 1931
